Major William Murray (1865 – 5 March 1923) was a Liberal Unionist and later Unionist Party politician in Scotland. He was elected at 1918 general election as the Member of Parliament (MP) for Dumfriesshire, as a Coalition Unionist, but did not stand again at the 1922 election.

Murray had earlier contested the seat as a Liberal Unionist in both the January 1910 and December 1910 general elections, but lost on both occasions by margins (by margins of 6.6% and 6.4% respectively). He had also stood twice without success in the Dumfries Burghs constituency, at the 1895 and 1900 general elections.

References

External links

1865 births
1923 deaths
UK MPs 1918–1922
Unionist Party (Scotland) MPs
Liberal Unionist Party parliamentary candidates